Chedabucto Bay  is a large bay on the eastern coast  of mainland Nova Scotia  between the Atlantic Ocean and the Strait of Canso next to Guysborough County. At the entrance to Chedabucto Bay is the community of Canso at the head  is the community of Guysborough and on the other end is the town of Mulgrave.

Geography
Chedabucto Bay was formed by the drowning of part of an ancient river system and owes its origin and shape to position of the Chedabucto Fault, which runs across central Nova Scotia from the Bay of Fundy to the Canso peninsula.

History

Colonial
Merchants in La Rochelle, France enjoyed a fishing monopoly in Acadia and formed the Company of Acadia which established a small fortification on Chedabucto Bay named Fort St. Louis. The principal ports were at Chedabucto, which accounted for fifty fishers in 1686. In 1690, Captain Cyprian Southack proceeded to Chedabucto to take Fort St. Louis at the present-day village of Guysborough which, unlike Port-Royal, put up a fight before surrendering.< The company encountered a variety of difficulties on the way to its final disappearance in 1702.

Modern
On Wednesday, February 4, 1970 the Liberian-registered tanker Arrow ran aground on Cerberus Rock with a cargo of  barrels of Bunker C fuel and split in two. However, ever since the oil was largely cleaned up by both Human cleanup crews and natural processes, the sunk Tanker has proven to be largely positive for the local wildlife- providing sanctuary for many sea creatures and a home for a vast variety of aquatic plant life.

References

Bays of Nova Scotia
Landforms of Guysborough County, Nova Scotia
Conflicts in Nova Scotia